Sir Richard Carew, 1st Baronet (ca. 1580 – 14 March 1643), of Antony in Cornwall, was a British writer and Member of Parliament.

Life
Carew was the eldest son of the antiquary Richard Carew (1555–1620). He was educated at Oxford, probably at Merton, and studied law at the Middle Temple. He also visited the courts of Poland, Sweden and France, the first two as part of an embassy led by his uncle and the last in attendance on the ambassador, Sir Henry Nevill. He entered Parliament in 1614 as member for Cornwall, and subsequently also represented Mitchell in 1621–2.

Carew published several works, including a treatise written to prove that "a warming stone" was "useful and comfortable for the colds of aged and sick people". His most notable work, however, was the True and readie Way to learne the Latine Tongue, attested by three excellently learned and approved authours of three nations, of which he was the English author. 
This was not published until 1654, well after his death, and apparently only made its way into print on the misapprehension that it was his more distinguished father who had penned it. 
The work argues for learning by translating back and forth, with a minimal amount of grammar teaching.

On 9 August 1641, Richard Carew was created a baronet. 
He died less than two years later.

Family
He had married twice: first, during his father's lifetime, to Bridget Chudleigh, by whom he had one son, Alexander (who succeeded to the baronetcy), and four daughters. 
After her death he married again, to a Miss Rolle, and they had at least two other sons, John and Thomas. 

The Civil War divided the family, and proved particularly fateful for them, for two years after Sir Richard's death Sir Alexander was executed on Tower Hill for treason as a Royalist, while John as a loyal Parliamentarian sat on the court that condemned King Charles and was eventually hanged, drawn and quartered as a regicide at the Restoration.

Notes

References

External links

Dictionary of National Biography
Burke's Extinct and Dormant Baronetcies (2nd edition, London: John Russell Smith, 1844) 
Vivian's Visitations of Cornwall (Exeter: William Pollard & Co, 1887)  
 

|-

1580s births
1643 deaths
Baronets in the Baronetage of England
Year of birth uncertain
Members of the pre-1707 English Parliament for constituencies in Cornwall
People from Antony, Cornwall
Writers from Cornwall
17th-century English writers
17th-century English male writers
Richard
English MPs 1614
English MPs 1621–1622
Carew baronets